"Woman to Woman" is a song written by Joe Cocker and Christopher Stainton. It was released on Cocker's 1972 album Joe Cocker and reached the top in the singles chart of Spain. The song was billed as Joe Cocker with The Chris Stainton Band.

Other recordings and samples
The song has been recorded by other artists. It has also been heavily sampled in hip hop,  for example, "Funky" by Ultramagnetic MCs (1987), "Knick Knack Patty Wack" by EPMD (1989), "Blast from the Past" by Ultramagnetic MCs (1992), "New Jack Swing II" by Wreckx-N-Effect, "California Love" by Tupac featuring Dr. Dre and Roger Troutman (1995), "Honey" by Moby (1999), "Astro Black" by Quasimoto (2000), "He's Unbelievable" by Sarah Connor (October 29, 2002), and "We Keep It Rockin'" by Maino featuring Swizz Beatz, Jadakiss, Jim Jones and Joell Ortiz (2010).

Video game soundtrack
It was also included in the soundtrack for the video game Grand Theft Auto: San Andreas, on the K-DST radio station, where Tommy "The Nightmare" Smith (Axl Rose) introduces the song with the words, "I think you're gonna love this record... or you would if you were man enough." In 2014, the song was removed from the game remastered versions for Xbox 360, PlayStation 3, iOS, Android, Steam and Rockstar Games Launcher. It was not included either included on the remastered versions from Grand Theft Auto: The Trilogy - The Definitive Edition.

References

1972 songs
Joe Cocker songs